To Keep from Crying is the second album by progressive folk band Comus, released in 1974. It featured a notably different lineup from their other releases, with the violin/viola and woodwind spots replaced by keyboards and a conventional drum kit.  The album's content has also been noted as sounding more mainstream than their earlier work, which centred more in conventional progressive rock and folk.

Reception

Allmusic's retrospective review praised the vocal arrangements and male/female harmonies of songs such as "Figure in Your Dreams" and "Perpetual Motion", and were even more endeared to "dark folk songs" such as "Touch Down", with its "ghostly children's chorus" and "cosmic synth tones". However, they criticized the Japanese issue of the album for editing "Waves and Caves" and "After the Dream" down to well under a minute each and concluded "The record is pretty good, but it has the misfortune of paling in the shadow of its nightmarish predecessor."

Track listing

Personnel
Bobbie Watson – lead and backing vocals, percussion, recorder
Roger Wootton - guitar, lead and backing vocals
Keith Hale – piano, organ, electric piano, synthesizer, marimba
Andy Hellaby – bass, autoharp, tape effects
Gordon Coxon – drums, percussion

Additional musicians
Philip Barry – bongos
Lindsay Cooper – bassoon on "To Keep from Crying"
Didier Malherbe – saxophone on "Get Yourself a Man"
Tim Kraemer – cello on "So Long Supernova"

References

External links

Comus (band) albums
1974 albums
Virgin Records albums